Patrick James Moore (December 22, 1863 – March 10, 1936) known as "P.J.", was an American politician who served as a member of the Massachusetts House of Representatives, as well as a member of the Common Council, Alderman, and Mayor of Pittsfield, Massachusetts.

He died in 1936.

See also
 1931–1932 Massachusetts legislature

Notes

1863 births
1936 deaths
Massachusetts city council members
Members of the Massachusetts House of Representatives
Mayors of Pittsfield, Massachusetts